The Nebraska Outback is the north-central region of the U.S. state of Nebraska. It comprises Boyd, Holt, Rock, Blaine, Brown, Keya Paha and Cherry counties.

About
Calling this region the "Nebraska Outback" is part of a tourism campaign led by a nonprofit organization called the North Central Nebraska RC & D Council. It is sponsored by six counties, five Natural Resource Districts, 29 local communities and three local Chambers of Commerce.

The North Central Nebraska RC&D Council partners with communities, organizations and agencies to assist the local people in the development of their communities, counties and region.
The Outback is bordered by South Dakota on the north, and a small section of the Missouri River runs at the region’s eastern edge.

The outback is connected with the rest of Nebraska by way of four Nebraska byways: Bridges to Buttes Byway (Highway 20), the Outlaw Trail (Highway 12) and small sections of the Loup Rivers Scenic Byway (Highways 91/11), and the Sandhills Journey (Highway 2) in Blaine County.

Visitor attractions

Particular attractions in the area have been identified in order to promote tourism throughout the Outback.

See also
 History of Nebraska
 Historic houses in Nebraska
 Landmarks of the Nebraska Territory

References

External links
 Ainsworth
 Stories from the Outback
 Mountain biking in the Nebraska Outback

Tourist attractions in Nebraska
Regions of Nebraska